The 1988 United States presidential election in New Jersey took place on November 8, 1988. All 50 states and the District of Columbia, were part of the 1988 United States presidential election. Voters chose 16 electors to the Electoral College, which selected the president and vice president.

New Jersey was won by incumbent Republican Vice President George H. W. Bush of Texas, who was running against Democratic Massachusetts Governor Michael Dukakis. Bush ran with Indiana Senator Dan Quayle while Dukakis ran with Texas Senator Lloyd Bentsen.

Bush carried New Jersey with 56.24% of the vote, while Dukakis received 42.60% a 13.64% margin of victory.

New Jersey weighed in for this election as almost 6% points more Republican than the national average. Bush won 18 of New Jersey's 21 counties, with Dukakis only winning the heavily Democratic counties of Mercer, Essex, and Hudson. This remains the last election in which a Republican presidential candidate has won the following counties: Atlantic, Burlington, Camden, Cumberland, Middlesex, and Union. All of these counties would become reliably Democratic in every election that has followed as northern suburban voters shifted away from the GOP in the 1990s. Consequently, this would be the last time New Jersey would vote for the Republican presidential nominee.

The presidential election of 1988 was a very partisan election for New Jersey, with more than 99% of the electorate voting for either the Democratic or Republican parties, though a total of 11 parties did appear on the ballot. Bush won the election in New Jersey with a strong 13.6-point margin. This is the most recent presidential election where New Jersey sent Republican electors to the Electoral College. The election results in New Jersey are reflective of a nationwide political re-consolidation of base for the Republican Party, which took place through the 1980s. Through the passage of some very controversial economic programs, spearheaded by then President Ronald Reagan (called, collectively, "Reaganomics"), the mid-to-late 1980s arguably saw a period of economic growth and stability. The hallmark of Reaganomics was partly the wide-scale deregulation of corporate interests and tax cuts.

Dukakis ran on a socially liberal platform, and advocated for higher economic regulation and environmental protection. Bush, alternatively, ran on a campaign of continuing the social and economic policies of former President Reagan - which gained him much support with social conservatives and people living in rural areas.

Results

Results by county

By congressional district
Bush won 12 of 14 congressional districts, including six that elected Democrats.

See also
 United States presidential elections in New Jersey
 Presidency of George H. W. Bush

References

New Jersey
1988
1988 New Jersey elections